Šefik Džaferović (born 9 September 1957) is a Bosnian politician who served as the 7th Bosniak member of the Presidency of Bosnia and Herzegovina from 2018 to 2022. He is a member of the national House of Peoples. A high ranking member of the Party of Democratic Action, he is the party's current vice president and was formerly its general secretary.

Džaferović graduated from the Faculty of Law at the University of Sarajevo in 1979. Before entering politics, he worked in judicial institutions. In 1996, Džaferović was appointed member of the Federal House of Peoples. In 2000, he became a member of the national House of Peoples. At the 2002 general election, Džaferović was elected to the national House of Representatives, and served as its member until 2018.

From 2018 until 2022, Džaferović served in the Bosnian Presidency as its Bosniak member, having been elected at the 2018 general election by a narrow margin. Following the 2022 general election, he once again became a member of the national House of Peoples.

Early life and education
Džaferović was born in 1957 in the Bosnian town of Zavidovići in the former Yugoslavia, modern-day Bosnia and Herzegovina. He went to a Gymnasium in Zavidovići. After that, he graduated from the Faculty of Law at the University of Sarajevo in 1979. Džaferović worked in judicial institutions and for the police department in Zavidovići and Zenica until 1996.

Early political career
In 1996, Džaferović was elected to the council of Zenica-Doboj Canton. In the same year, he became a delegate in the Federal House of Peoples. Four years later, he entered the national House of Peoples. At the 2002 general election, he became a member of the national House of Representatives. At the 2014 general election, Džaferović was re-elected for a third time to the national House of Representatives with 30,000 votes. While in the House of Representatives, he served as its chairman on multiple occasions.

Presidency (2018–2022)

2018 general election

Džaferović announced his candidacy in the Bosnian general election on 26 May 2018, running for Bosnia's three-person Presidency member, representing the Bosniaks. 

At the general election, held on 7 October 2018, he was elected to the Presidency, having obtained 36.61% of the vote. The Social Democratic Party candidate Denis Bećirović, was second with 33.53%.

Domestic policy

In the first month of his presidency, Džaferović had problems with Serb member Milorad Dodik, Chairman of the Presidency at the time, with Dodik stating he would not attend the first Presidency session under the new leadership until the flag of Republika Srpska, the entity of Bosnia and Herzegovina, was put in his office. Dodik eventually relented, agreeing to hold the session with only the flag of Bosnia and Herzegovina.

On 20 March 2020, Džaferović became the new Presidency Chairman for the following eight months, succeeding Croat member Željko Komšić. After the eight months passed, on 20 November 2020, he was succeeded by Dodik as chairman. 

On 22 May 2021, Džaferović and Komšić attended a military exercise between the United States Army and the Armed Forces of Bosnia and Herzegovina on mount Manjača, south of the city Banja Luka in Bosnia and Herzegovina, while Milorad Dodik refused to attend it.

On 20 March 2022, Džaferović once again succeeded Komšić as Chairman of the Presidency, according to the principle of rotation.

On 16 November 2022, Džaferović was succeeded by Denis Bećirović as the Bosniak member of the Presidency.

COVID-19 pandemic

As the COVID-19 pandemic in Bosnia and Herzegovina started in March 2020, the Presidency announced Armed Forces' placement of quarantine tents at the country's borders intended for Bosnian citizens returning home. Every Bosnian citizen arriving to the country was obligated to self-quarantine for 14 days starting from the day of arrival. Tents were set up on the northern border with Croatia.

On 2 March 2021, Serbian president Aleksandar Vučić came to Sarajevo and met with Džaferović and other presidency members, Komšić and Dodik, and donated 10,000 dozes of AstraZeneca COVID-19 vaccines for the COVID-19 pandemic. Three days later, on 5 March, Slovenian president Borut Pahor also came to Sarajevo and met with Džaferović, Komšić and Dodik, and stated that Slovenia will also donate 4,800 AstraZeneca COVID-19 vaccines for the pandemic.

On 22 March, in an interview for Federalna televizija, Džaferović stated:  This statement was met with heavy backlash by opposition parties in the country, with Our Party commenting on Džaferović's statement: "With disinformation, Džaferović is trying to take away responsibility from himself and his party." Nermin Nikšić, president of the Social Democratic Party, replied to Džaferović: "With his statement that our country does not lack behind the region in vaccination, Džaferović showed that he does not differ from his party "boss" Izetbegović [Bakir Izetbegović] or Prime Minister Novalić [Fadil Novalić]." Nikšić ended with saying that "according to official statistics, we are at the bottom of the list in terms of the COVID-19 vaccination rate, behind Rwanda, Cambodia and Zimbabwe." Džaferović's statement also encountered a series of witty and original reactions on social media platforms.

On 16 July 2021, Džaferović received his first dose of the Sinopharm BIBP COVID-19 vaccine, amid its pandemic in Bosnia and Herzegovina. He received his second dose of the BIBP vaccine nearly a month later after his first dose, on 13 August.

Military helicopters controversy

In August 2021, Džaferović and Komšić, without including Dodik, instructed the Ministry of Security to be available for putting out wildfires in Herzegovina which had formed a few days before. This came after Dodik, as the third member of the Presidency, refused to give consent on the Bosnian Armed Forces to use its military helicopters to help in putting out the fires, because the consent of all three members of the Presidency is required for the military force's helicopters to be used.

Foreign policy
In December 2020, right before a state visit of Russian foreign minister Sergey Lavrov, Džaferović refused to attend the visit because of Lavrov's disrespect to Bosnia and Herzegovina and decision to firstly visit only Bosnian Serb leader Milorad Dodik and later on the Presidency consisting of Željko Komšić, Dodik and Džaferović. Shortly before Džaferović, Komšić also refused to attend Lavrov's visit because of the same reasons as Džaferović.

Following Russia recognizing the Donetsk People's Republic and the Luhansk People's Republic as independent states on 21 February 2022, which are disputed territories in the Ukrainian region of Donbas, Džaferović condemned Russia’s moves to recognize the independence of Donetsk and Luhansk: 

On 24 February 2022, Russian president Vladimir Putin ordered a large-scale invasion of Ukraine, marking a dramatic escalation of the Russo-Ukrainian War that began in 2014. Regarding the invasion, Džaferović said that "Bosnia and Herzegovina stands with the people who suffered brutal attacks by Russian military forces in cities all over Ukraine. Our prayers and best wishes are with them."

European Union

In September 2020, Džaferović and his fellow Presidency members said that an EU candidate status for Bosnia and Herzegovina is possible in the year 2021 if the country "implements successful reforms".

On 30 September 2021, Džaferović, Komšić and Dodik met with European Commission President Ursula von der Leyen at the Presidency Building in Sarajevo. This was part of von der Leyen's visit to Bosnia and Herzegovina, since she some hours before opened the Svilaj border checkpoint and a bridge over the nearby Sava river, which bears the internationally important freeway Pan-European Corridor Vc.

On 1 December 2021, Džaferović and Komšić met with German Minister of State for Europe Michael Roth, with the main topics of discussion being the political situation in Bosnia and Herzegovina, reform processes and activities on the country's EU path. On 20 May 2022, he met with European Council President Charles Michel, during his visit to Sarajevo, with whom he discussed about Bosnia and Herzegovina's accession to the EU.

Relations with Turkey

On 16 March 2021, Džaferović, Komšić and Dodik went on a state visit to Turkey to meet with Turkish President Recep Tayyip Erdoğan. While there, Erdoğan promised to donate Bosnia and Herzegovina 30,000 COVID-19 vaccines for the COVID-19 pandemic. Also on the meeting, Bosnia and Herzegovina and Turkey agreed on mutual recognition and exchange of driving licenses, as well as signing an agreement on cooperation in infrastructure and construction projects, which also refers to the construction of a highway from Bosnia's capital Sarajevo to Serbia's capital Belgrade; the agreement being signed by Minister of Communication and Traffic Vojin Mitrović.

On 21 July 2021, Džaferović spoke in a telephone call with Erdoğan, exchanging Eid al-Adha greetings and also discussing about economic cooperation.

On 27 August 2021, Erdoğan came to Sarajevo on a state visit in Bosnia and Herzegovina and met with all three Presidency members, having talks about more economic and infrastructural cooperation, as well as looking into the construction of the highway from Sarajevo to Belgrade. Also, a trilateral meeting between Turkey, Serbia and Bosnia and Herzegovina was agreed on and should happen in the near future.

Balkan non-papers

In April 2021, Džaferović sent a letter of concern to European Council President Charles Michel upon a supposed non-paper sent by Slovenian Prime Minister Janez Janša, regarding possible border changes in the Western Balkans. After hearing news about the supposed non-paper, Janša spoke in a telephone call with Džaferović, stating that "there is no non-paper regarding border changes in the Western Balkans" and adding that he supports "the territorial integrity of Bosnia and Herzegovina".

Later career
Following his presidency, Džaferović was appointed member of the national House of Peoples on 16 February 2023.

Personal life
Džaferović has been married to his wife Vildana since 1980. They have two children, Jasmin and Jasmina. They live in Sarajevo.

References

External links

Šefik Džaferović at imovinapoliticara.cin.ba

1957 births
Living people
People from Zavidovići
Bosnia and Herzegovina Muslims
Bosniaks of Bosnia and Herzegovina
Bosniak politicians
University of Sarajevo alumni
Party of Democratic Action politicians
Members of the House of Peoples of Bosnia and Herzegovina
Members of the House of Representatives (Bosnia and Herzegovina)
Chairmen of the House of Representatives (Bosnia and Herzegovina)
Members of the Presidency of Bosnia and Herzegovina
Chairmen of the Presidency of Bosnia and Herzegovina
Foreign recipients of the Nishan-e-Pakistan